Gera-Aue is a Verwaltungsgemeinschaft ("collective municipality") in the district of Sömmerda, in Thuringia, Germany. The seat of the Verwaltungsgemeinschaft is in Gebesee.

The Verwaltungsgemeinschaft Gera-Aue consists of the following municipalities:
Andisleben 
Gebesee
Ringleben 
Walschleben

References

Verwaltungsgemeinschaften in Thuringia